Leninsky District is an administrative and municipal district (raion), one of the five in the Jewish Autonomous Oblast, Russia. It is located in the south and center of the autonomous oblast. Its administrative center is the rural locality (a selo) of Leninskoye. Population: 20,684 (2010 Census);  The population of Leninskoye accounts for 29.5% of the district's total population.

Geography   
Leninsky District is located in the south central region of the Jewish Autonomous Oblast.  About 132 km of the Amur River runs along the southern border of Leninsky.  The district is about 160 km west of the city of Khabarovsk, and the area measures 90 km (north-south) by 100 km (west-east).  About 60% of the district is on the Middle Plain of the Amur River, with the remainder on the northern foothills of the Lesser Khingan mountains.  The area has commercial deposits of building materials: granite, sandstone, clay and gravel.

The district is bordered on the north by Obluchensky District, on the west by Oktyabrsky District, on the east by Birobidzhansky District, on the south across the Amur is China.

History
After the area came under the official control of Russia in 1858, after the Treaty of Aigun with China, the Russian government resettled Trans-Baikal Cossacks into the district to provide a military presence.  Volunteers were insufficient, so settlers were selected by lot and relocated down the Amur River on rafts with their families.   District was officially constituted in 1934.

References

Notes

Sources

External links
Leninsky District on Google Maps
Leninsky District on OpenStreetMap

Districts of Jewish Autonomous Oblast